Clean Hands of Vojvodina was a political coalition in the Serbian province of Vojvodina. At the last legislative elections in Vojvodina, on September 19, 2004, the alliance won 2.29% of the popular vote, and no seats in the provincial parliament. The alliance was formed by the Reformists of Vojvodina, Serbian Renewal Movement, and Resistance. The leader of the political alliance was Miodrag Isakov.

References 

Defunct political party alliances in Serbia
Politics of Vojvodina